is a 1997 Japanese crime drama film written and directed by Masato Harada. Its alternative English-language titles are Call Girls and Leaving.

Filmed in somewhat of a documentary style, it follows the course of three girls for a day and a night in the popular district of Shibuya in Tokyo. 

The main characters are: Jonko (Hitomi Satô), who runs a group of high-school girls involved in paid dating (in Japanese Enjo Kôsai 援助交際), Raku (Yasue Sato) who is a high-schooler and also a street dancer; and Lisa ( Yukiko Okamoto) who is a student, who worked for a year, saving enough money and a plane ticket, to go study in New York.

Cast
 Hitomi Satō as Jonko
 Yasue Sato as Raku-chan
 Yukiko Okamoto as Risa
 Kōji Yakusho as Ōshima
 Jun Murakami as Sap
 Shin Yazawa as Maru
 Kaori Momoi as Saki
 Maori as Kuji
 Kaitō Ren as Shingo
 Yūjin Harada as Moro
 Hiroshige Ikeda as Neon
 Hitoshi Kiyokawa as Tera
 Kazuki Kosakai as Koide

Awards and nominations
40th Blue Ribbon Awards
 Won: Best Film
 Won: Best Director – Masato Harada
 Won: Best Newcomer – Hitomi Satō
22nd Hochi Film Award 
 Won: Best Director – Masato Harada
 Won: Best Actor – Kōji Yakusho

References

External links
 
 
 Bounce Ko Gals at allcinema (in Japanese)
 Bounce Ko Gals at KINENOTE (in Japanese)

1997 films
1997 crime drama films
Films directed by Masato Harada
Gyaru in fiction
Japanese crime drama films
1990s Japanese-language films
1990s Japanese films